San Esteban de Pravia is one of two parishes (administrative divisions) in Muros de Nalón, a municipality within the province and autonomous community of Asturias, in northern Spain.

Population 

Parishes in Muros de Nalón